"Can't Say No" is the debut single by British singer Conor Maynard. It was first released on 2 March 2012 in Belgium, then in the United Kingdom on 29 April 2012. The song is the lead single of his debut album Contrast The song was written and produced by The Invisible Men with additional production from The Arcade and was also written by Sophie Stern, Jon Mills, Joe Dyer, Kurtis McKenzie and Maynard.

Music video
A music video to accompany the release of "Can't Say No" was first released onto YouTube on 1 March 2012 at a total length of three minutes and fifteen seconds. The video follows Maynard as he meets his friends as they all go to a party. It was directed by Rohan Blair-Mangat

Critical reception
Lewis Corner of Digital Spy gave the song a positive review stating:

'He croons over buzzing bass and crisp beats, before things tumble into an ear-grabbing chorus bouncier than an inflatable castle. In fact, the final result is much the same; it's playful, fun and immediately leaves you wanting another go. .

Track listing

Chart performance

Weekly charts

Year-end charts

Certifications

Release history

References

2012 debut singles
Conor Maynard songs
2012 songs
Parlophone singles
Songs written by Jason Pebworth
Songs written by George Astasio
Songs written by Jon Shave
Songs written by Kurtis Mckenzie